Adolfo Sormani (born 11 August 1965) is an Italian retired footballer and current head coach. He is the son of former footballer and coach Angelo Sormani.

Playing career
A Napoli youth product, he has mostly played in the minor divisions of Italy, except for a short stint at Avellino.

Coaching career
Following his retirement as a player, Sormani became a coach and served in the youth teams of Juventus and Napoli as well.

He briefly served in 2016 as head coach of Albanian team Partizani Tirana. Successively he was appointed in charge of Danish second division club Vejle Boldklub, guiding them to promotion before leaving in 2019.

After a short return at Partizani Tirana in 2020, he was named new head coach of Serie D club Lavello before being fired in November 2021.

References

1965 births
Living people
Footballers from Naples
Italian footballers
Association football midfielders
Serie A players
Serie B players
S.S.C. Napoli players
U.S. Avellino 1912 players
Italian football managers
F.C. Südtirol managers
FK Partizani Tirana managers
Vejle Boldklub managers
Kategoria Superiore managers
Italian expatriate football managers
Expatriate football managers in Albania
Italian expatriate sportspeople in Albania
Expatriate football managers in Denmark
Italian expatriate sportspeople in Denmark